Binngarra was a ferry operated by Port Jackson & Manly Steamship Company on the Manly service. Launched in 1905, she was the first of six similar vessels built for the company–the Binngarra class—the success of which saw three of her sister vessels serving through to the 1970s and 1980s.

Built by Mort's Dock and Engineering Co Ltd, in Woolwich, she was a double-ended screw steamer with steel hull and timber superstructure. She was decommissioned from ferry service in 1930.

"Binngarra" is thought to be an Australia Aboriginal word for "spring" or "returning". It is sometimes misspelled as "Bingarra".

Background

The Port Jackson & Manly Steamship Company's fleet transitioned comparatively late to screw propelled vessels and the fleet comprised mostly paddle steamers until the early years of the twentieth century. The difficulty of turning in the narrow bays of Sydney Harbour - particularly in the busy Circular Quay terminus in Sydney Cove - required the use of double-ended vessels. However, a double-ended screw configuration was particularly difficult for the fine bows that Manly ferries required for both speed and heavy seas. Further, a propeller at the leading forward end of a vessel reduced speed considerably. In the prosperous early twentieth century, this speed drawback was overcome by increasing engine size and power.

The first screw ferries on the Manly run were two innovative Walter Reeks–designed vessels; the SS Manly (1896), and SS Kuring-gai (1901), which were to become the fore-runners of the "Binngarra-class" ferries. They both had high forecastles at either to help her run through the deep-sea conditions across the Sydney Heads. The steel-hulled Kuring-gai was larger and she further refined the basic design that would be the basis of the subsequent and larger "Binngarra-class" vessels.

Design and construction

While Manly and Kuring-gai followed paddle steamer design with their bridges around the midships funnels, the "Binngarra-class" vessels would have their wheelhouses at either end of their sun decks. Subsequent to Binngarra, five similar refinements of the design were built - Burra-Bra (1908), Bellubera (1910), Balgowlah (1912), Barrenjoey (1913), and Baragoola (1922). The class were designed by Mort's Dock and Engineering, initially under the guidance of former chief draughtsman Andrew Christie. Binngarra and the next four were built at Mort's Woolwich yard while Baragoola was built at the Balmain yard. They were among the largest ships built in Australian yards at the time and, on the admission of Mort's executives, were built by the dock more for prestige than profit. Build costs were higher in Australia than in the United Kingdom, but this was offset by the cost of sailing them out to Australia.

A donkey boiler also fitted.

Service history
Binngarra had her official trials on 26 October 1905 where she reached  and she entered service three days later on the 3 pm run from Circular Quay to Manly. Two days after she collided with the sea wall at the Quay.

In 1926, she collided with the wooden K-class ferry, Kanimbla. Damage to the larger steel Binngarra was minimal, however, Kanimbla was severely damaged and according to some reports, was lucky not to sink.

It is estimated that over her 24 years of ferry service, Binngarra completed close to 100,000 round trips to Manly and carried 30 million passengers. She and Kuring-gai were removed from service in 1930 and 1928 respectively, following the 1928 introduction of the larger and faster Dee Why and Curl Curl. Binngarra was sold and hulked in 1933 and used in Port Stephens. Following her use in New Guinea as a cargo hulk for United States Navy during World War II, she was scuttled off Sydney on 11 December1946.

See also
 List of Sydney Harbour ferries
 Timeline of Sydney Harbour ferries

References

External links

Ferry transport in Sydney
Sydney Harbour ferries
Ferries of New South Wales
Ships built in New South Wales
1905 ships
Scuttled vessels of New South Wales